Notomabuya is a genus of skinks. It contains one species, Notomabuya frenata,  which is found in South America (Brazil, Bolivia, Paraguay, and northeast Argentina.

Characteristics 
This species is viviparous and shows sexual dimorphism in body size, with adults females being bigger than males.

Ecology 
N. frenata is an diurnal and viviparous species, and its diet is composed mainly by small arthropods, although preying in another smaller lizards and even cannibalism were already registered.

References

Skinks
Lizards of South America
Reptiles of Argentina
Reptiles of Bolivia
Reptiles of Brazil
Reptiles of Paraguay
Taxa named by Edward Drinker Cope
Reptiles described in 1862